Killer Women is an American crime drama television series that aired on ABC from January 7 to March 25, 2014. The series is based on the Argentine crime drama Mujeres Asesinas, which was adapted into an American setting by writer Hannah Shakespeare. Shakespeare also serves as an executive producer alongside Sofía Vergara, Ben Silverman, Luis Balaguer, and Martin Campbell for Pol-Ka Productions, Silverman's Electus Productions, Vergara and Balaguer's Latin World Entertainment, and ABC Studios. The series stars Tricia Helfer. The pilot episode was directed by Lawrence Trilling.

On May 9, 2014, ABC cancelled the series after one season.

Premise
The series follows the life of Molly Parker, a former beauty queen and daughter of a sheriff who is recently separated from her abusive State Senator husband. She rises to the top ranks of one of the most elite and male-dominated law enforcement establishments, the Texas Rangers. The perpetrators of the episodic crimes she solves are all female.

Cast and characters

Main cast
Tricia Helfer as Molly Parker, a Texas Ranger
Marc Blucas as Dan Winston, a DEA agent and Molly's love interest
Alex Fernandez as Luis Zea, Molly's boss
Michael Trucco as Billy Parker, Molly's brother
Marta Milans as Becca Parker, Billy's wife
Seina Agudong as Lulu Parker, Becca and Billy’s daughter

Guest stars
Nadine Velazquez as Martina Alvarez
Beth Riesgraf as Jennifer Jennings
Melora Hardin as Nan Reed
Jeffrey Nordling as Jake Colton
Vincent Fuentes as Paco La Mosca
Paul Howard Smith as Sherriff Lloyd Watkins
Aisha Hinds as FBI Agent Linda Clark
Peyton McDavitt as Andrea Corbett
Paola Turbay as Carmen Garza
Alexandra Pomales as Hailee Parker
Michael Shamus Wiles as Colt Ritter
Arlin Alcala as Nurse Sanchez

Episodes

Critical response
The series premiere was panned by critic Tim Goodman, who wrote: "Killer Women wants to be styled as a kind of cheap, broadcast network knockoff of Quentin Tarantino or something, but ends up redefining 'hokey' in the process." ABC initially placed an eight-episode order for Killer Women, but after low ratings for the first two episodes, especially in the 18–49 demographic (0.9 and 0.7), the first season run was shortened to six episodes. Episode 7 was aired on February 18 as series finale instead of episode 6, because it provided a better ending with the granting of Molly's divorce. As a result, ABC moved up the premiere of the rookie drama Mind Games from March 11 to February 25.

References

External links
 

2010s American crime drama television series
2014 American television series debuts
2014 American television series endings
American Broadcasting Company original programming
American television series based on Argentine television series
English-language television shows
Television series by ABC Studios
Television shows set in Texas
Television series about the Texas Ranger Division
Fictional characters of the Texas Ranger Division
Works about Mexican drug cartels